Prowlers of the Night is a 1926 American silent Western film directed by Ernst Laemmle and starring Fred Humes, Barbara Kent and Slim Cole.

Cast
 Fred Humes as Jack Morton 
 Barbara Kent as Anita Parsons 
 Slim Cole as Al Parsons 
 John T. Prince as George Moulton 
 Joseph Belmont as Sheriff Brandon 
 Walter Maly as Bell

References

Bibliography
 Langman, Larry. A Guide to Silent Westerns. Greenwood Publishing Group, 1992.

External links
 

1926 films
1926 Western (genre) films
Universal Pictures films
Films directed by Ernst Laemmle
American black-and-white films
Silent American Western (genre) films
1920s English-language films
1920s American films